is a former Japanese football player and manager.

Coaching career
Ono became assistant coach of Japan national team under the manager; Takeshi Okada from 1997 to 1998. From 1999, he became assistant coach of Japan U-20 national team. In 2002, he became manager of Sanfrecce Hiroshima. In 2012, he became assistant coach of Chinese club; Hangzhou Greentown under the manager; Takeshi Okada. In 2014, he became manager Roasso Kumamoto. In 2016, he became assistant coach of Hangzhou Greentown again.

Managerial statistics

References

External links

2015 Profile

1962 births
Living people
University of Tsukuba alumni
Association football people from Chiba Prefecture
Japanese footballers
Japanese football managers
J1 League managers
J2 League managers
Sanfrecce Hiroshima managers
Roasso Kumamoto managers
FC Imabari managers
Association footballers not categorized by position